William Graham was an English professional footballer who played as a winger.

References

Year of birth unknown
English footballers
Association football wingers
Burnley F.C. players
Lincoln City F.C. players
English Football League players
Year of death missing